Art Jakarta is a contemporary art fair, held annually in Jakarta, Indonesia. The fair is usually held at Jakarta Convention Center at Senayan. The fair is organised by fashion and lifestyle magazine Harper's Bazaar Indonesia since 2009. Art Jakarta was previously known as Bazaar Art Jakarta. Artists, galleries, collectors, and art critics from all over the world participate in this fair. The fair already established as one of Southeast Asia’s most important art fairs.

Chonology
Since its inception in 2009 up-to 2016 the fair was known as Bazaar Art Jakarta (BAJ). It was renamed as Art Jakarta from 2017 edition.

Last edition as Bazaar Art Jakarta (BAJ) was held in 2016 in which 23 overseas and 19 local art galleries took part. More than 1,500 art pieces were displayed in the fair.

Bazaar Art Jakarta changed name as Art Jakarta in 2017. Art Jakarta was held from 28 August to 30 August. Among the galleries were Jakarta’s Vivi Yip Artroom and Ruci Art Space, Bandung’s Lawangwangi Creative Space, Zola Zulu  and Singapore’s Art Xchange Gallery, Art Front Gallery Element Art Space, Pearl Lam Galleries and Yavuz Gallery.

10th edition of Art Jakarta was held in 2018, from August 2 to August 5. The 10th year celebration of Art Jakarta 2018 presents 51 art galleries. As many as 20 galleries come from Indonesia and the rest are from overseas countries. Among the galleries were ROH Projects, Gajah Gallery, RUCI Gallery, Mizuma Gallery, Lawangwangi Creative Space, YEO Workshop, Image Warehouse, Museum MACAN, Ciputra Museum and many others. Japan Art Now, which presented the 10 most recent Japanese artists with 10 years of Jakarta Art, Creative Art Classical by Ganara Art Space, and Creative Art Talk. The Art Jakarta 2018 presented more than 1,000 works from more than 300 artists both local and international.

In 2019 Art Jakarta, 70 local and overseas galleries from 14 countries took part. Among the participants were Singapore based Gajah Gallery,
Arario Gallery from South Korea, Mizuma Gallery from Japan, Galerie Ovo from Taiwan along with local galleries such as Nadi Gallery, Semarang Gallery and Can’s Gallery. Other than galleries and auction houses, Philips Asia displayed artworks, watches and jewelry.

References

Art fairs
Arts festivals in Indonesia
Annual events in Indonesia
Tourist attractions in Jakarta
Recurring events established in 2009
Events in Jakarta